Nursing Home is the second album by indie rock band Let's Wrestle. It was released on May 16, 2011 on Full Time Hobby, and the following day on Merge Records. It was produced by Steve Albini.

Lyrics
The album's lyrics contain humor and wit, focusing on topics such as playing computer games and hanging out with friends. The lyrics are also more self-deprecating and apathetic than those of Let's Wrestle's previous songs.

Critical reception

The album received generally favorable reviews from critics. In a mixed review, Daniel Tebo wrote, "There’s still a lot of fun to be had at this Nursing Home but it’s pretty clear that the party is winding down." In a more positive review, Robert Christgau wrote that in addition to maturing, the members of Let's Wrestle "do what all maturing s.-p.o.w.t.a. [slacker-punks or whatever they are] wish they could do--write better songs." Drowned in Sound's Michael Wheeler awarded the album a score of 8/10 and wrote that the song "For My Mother" was "probably the best and further proof of Let’s Wrestle’s idiot-savant genius."

Many reviewers perceived Nursing Home as reflecting a more mature band than did the band's debut, In the Court of the Wrestling Let's. According to Daniel Tebo, Nursing Home is "a few shades darker than expected." David Sheppard also praised Nursing Home as an improvement over their debut, writing that Nursing Home was "understandably crunchier than its predecessor," and that "this time the melodies are more consistently nagging and Gonzalez’s lyrics broader in scope." Michael Wheeler wrote that Nursing Home was "if not exactly refined, than certainly a little tighter and more focused in its abandon" than In the Court of the Wrestling Let's, and also described it as more coherent and unified.

Track listing
 In Dreams (Part 2)
 If I Keep on Loving You
 In the Suburbs
 Bad Mamories
 Dear John
 For My Mother
 I'm So Lazy
 There's a Rockstar in My Room
 I Forgot
 I Am Useful
 I Will Not Give In
 Getting Rest

Personnel
Steve Albini—Engineer
Darkus Bishop—Drums, Group Member
Wesley Patrick Gonzalez—Artwork, Composer, Group Member, Guitar, Vocals
Adam Kerle—Mastering
Mike Lightning—Bass, Group Member, Keyboards, Vocals
Merida Richards—Art Supervisor

References

2011 albums
Albums produced by Steve Albini
Merge Records albums
Full Time Hobby albums
Let's Wrestle albums